The 2022 San Jose mayoral election was held on November 8, 2022 to elect the next mayor of San Jose for a two-year term. A top-two primary was held on June 7, 2022, and no candidate received more than 50% in this primary election. Santa Clara County Supervisor Cindy Chavez and San Jose City Councilmember Matt Mahan advanced to a November 8 runoff election. On November 16, Cindy Chavez conceded the race to Matt Mahan.

Due to San Jose term limits, which sets a maximum of two total terms, incumbent mayor Sam Liccardo is not eligible to run for reelection. The 2022 mayoral election will be the last held on a Gubernatorial election cycle as a result of the passage of Measure B in 2022. Following mayoral elections will coincide with the Presidential election cycle.

Background 
San Jose is the 10th largest city in the United States. All local elections in the State of California are officially nonpartisan San Jose uses a top-two primary system; if no candidate receives a majority of the June 7, 2022 vote, a runoff will be held between the top two candidates on November 8, 2022.

On April 28, 2021, San Jose Councilmember Raul Peralez who currently represents Council District 3, Downtown San Jose, announced his candidacy. On the same day, Councilmember Dev Davis, who represents District 6, Willow Glen, also announced a campaign for mayor.

Primary Candidates

Declared
Cindy Chavez, President of the Santa Clara County Board of Supervisors (2020-present), former vice mayor of San Jose (2005-2007), former San Jose city councilmember for District 3 (1998-2006), and candidate for mayor in 2006 (Democratic)
Dev Davis, San Jose city councilmember, District 6 (2016-present) (Independent)
Travis Hill, student
Matt Mahan, San Jose city councilmember, District 10 (2021-present) (Democratic)
Raul Peralez, San Jose city councilmember, District 3  (2014-present) (Democratic)
James Spence, former San Jose police officer (Republican)
Marshall Woodmansee, San Jose State University student (Independent)

Disqualified
Jonathan Esteban, candidate for Nevada's 4th congressional district in 2020

General election

Endorsements

Polling

Results

Runoff

Results

Notes

Partisan clients

References

San Jose
San Jose
2022